Podocarpus levis is a species of conifer in the family Podocarpaceae. It ranges from eastern Borneo to Sulawesi, the Maluku Islands, and western New Guinea, in the countries of Brunei, Indonesia, and Malaysia.

References

levis
Least concern plants
Taxonomy articles created by Polbot
Taxa named by David John de Laubenfels
Flora of Borneo
Flora of Sulawesi